Kalayeh (also Romanized as Kalāyeh; also known as Kalāi, Kelā’ī, and Kelaya) is a village in Rahmatabad Rural District, Rahmatabad and Blukat District, Rudbar County, Gilan Province, Iran. At the 2006 census, its population was 189, distributed among 56 families.

References 

Populated places in Rudbar County